The list of shipwrecks in July 1821 includes ships sunk, wrecked or otherwise lost during July 1821.

1 July

2 July

3 July

4 July

9 July

13 July

15 July

17 July

18 July

19 July

21 July

25 July

26 July

29 July

Unknown date

References

1821-07